Piironen is a Finnish surname. Notable people with the surname include:

Jukka Piironen (1925–1976), Finnish pole vaulter
Paavo Piironen (1943–1974), Finnish film and television actor and director

See also 
3759 Piironen, a minor planet

Finnish-language surnames